Arthur Egerton Sixsmith (June 27, 1880 – March 15, 1969) was a Canadian professional ice hockey rover and businessman. He played for the Ottawa Hockey Club and later moved to Pittsburgh to play professionally.  He was a member of the Ottawa's 1901 CAHL championship team. As one of the first professional ice hockey players, he captained and managed several of the championship teams in the Western Pennsylvania Hockey League (WPHL). His brother, Garnet Sixsmith, also played professionally in Pittsburgh.

Career
Born in Ottawa, Ontario, Sixsmith first played senior hockey at the age of 15 with the Ottawa Cliffsides of the Ottawa City Hockey League. He played junior hockey until 1899 when he joined the Ottawa Hockey Club, playing two seasons for the club, scoring seven goals in nine games. During his time with the club, Ottawa won two CAHL titles.

In 1901, Art visited Pittsburgh on his way back to Ottawa from his wedding in Campbellton, New Brunswick. In Pittsburgh, he met Arthur McSwigan and the two men founded the WPHL. By 1902, Art convinced his brother, Garnet, and several other Canadian players to play in the new league.

He then turned professional with the WPHL's Pittsburgh Keystones, for which he played with for the next three seasons. During this time, he also served as the team's manager and won a WPHL title with the club in 1902. In 1903, became the captain and manager of the Pittsburgh Victorias. However, in 1905, the WPHL teams were consolidated into the Pittsburgh Professionals of the International Professional Hockey League (IPHL). Art then served as the captain of the Professionals for the next two seasons. When the WPHL was revived in 1907, Art played with the Pittsburgh Bankers for two further seasons. In 1915, Art became the manager of the Pittsburgh Winter Garden hockey team. The team was based at the Pittsburgh Winter Garden and featured his brother, Garnet. However, the team only lasted one season, before disbanding in 1916.

Following his hockey career, he went into the banking industry working his way up the corporate ladder in Mellon Banking to become Andrew W. Mellon's personal assistant. He held this position during Mr. Mellon's tenure working for U.S. Presidents: Herbert Hoover, Calvin Coolidge and Warren G. Harding. During this time he amassed a personal fortune of over ten million dollars only to lose it in the stock market crash of 1929. He retired to Florida, later lived with a son in Cheyenne, Wyoming and died in Titusville, Florida in 1969. He is buried in an unmarked grave at Pittsburgh's Homewood Cemetery.

Statistics

Exh. = Exhibition games

Statistics per Society for International Hockey Research at sihrhockey.org

References

External links
 

1880 births
1969 deaths
Ottawa Senators (original) players
Pittsburgh Bankers players
Pittsburgh Keystones (ice hockey) players
Pittsburgh Professionals players
Pittsburgh Victorias players
Sault Ste. Marie Marlboros players
Ice hockey people from Ottawa
Burials at Homewood Cemetery